Ross J. Irwin (born 9 May 1960) is a Scottish former professional footballer. He played for Fareham Town F.C. (England), FC Stade Nyonnais (Switzerland), the Bahama Royals (Bahamas) and the Boston Bolts and Albany Capitals of the American Soccer League.

Soccer  
After the collapse in 1984 of the North American Soccer League (NASL) featuring the New York Cosmos starring Brazilian forward Pelé, Italian striker Giorgio Chinaglia and the West German sweeper Franz Beckenbauer, the United States Soccer Federation realized that they had to develop home grown talent in order to be in a position to host the 1994 FIFA World Cup. In 1988 professional soccer returned to the US in the form of the American Soccer League. It had two divisions: Northern Division (Albany Capitals, Boston Bolts, Maryland Bays, New Jersey Eagles, Washington Stars) and Southern Division (Miami Sharks, Tampa Bay Rowdies, Orlando Lions, Washington Diplomats, Fort Lauderdale Strikers). Each franchise had a quota of only three non-American players in its first year and two in subsequent years. Irwin had the distinction of being the first player to be signed by the Boston franchise as one of their three foreign players.

During the 1988–89 season as sweeper and vice captain of the Boston Bolts, Irwin was selected as the only Boston player to the American Soccer League (ASL) All Star Team. He was one of two Scotsmen on the All Star team, being joined by former Scottish National Team goalkeeper Alan Rough. The All Star team played against the Fort Lauderdale Strikers at Lockhart Stadium in Fort Lauderdale, Florida, with the legendary George Best making a guest appearance for the Strikers.

In 1988 at Nickerson Field, Boston University, Irwin scored the winning goal for the Boston Bolts vs the Orlando Lions by placing a penalty kick beyond fellow Scotsman and Orlando goalkeeper Alan Rough. This was the team's first home game of the season and their first win. In 1989, following Irwin's selection to the ASL All Star team, he was signed by the Albany Capitals as one of their two foreign players. He joined US national team players John Harkes, Brian Bliss and Mike Windischmann, and former England international Paul Mariner.

Teaching  
Irwin graduated from Carnegie College, Leeds University, England, with a  B.Ed (Hons) Degree and earned a M.Ed from Cambridge College, Massachusetts, USA. He has taught high school mathematics for 38 years which included two years at the prestigious Institute Le Rosey in Switzerland before teaching at St Johns College in Nassau, Bahamas. From 1992-2022  Irwin taught mathematics at Medfield High School in Medfield, Massachusetts before retiring in June 2022.

References

The Boston Globe. BOLTS ARE ENTHUSED BY REACTION OF FANS http://www.highbeam.com/doc/1P2-8060898.html

External links

Living people
1960 births
Scottish footballers
Footballers from Glasgow
American soccer players
Association football defenders
American Soccer League (1988–89) players
Boston Bolts players
Albany Capitals players
Fareham Town F.C. players
FC Stade Nyonnais players
Scottish expatriate sportspeople in the United States
Expatriate soccer players in the United States
Scottish expatriate footballers
Scottish expatriate sportspeople in Switzerland
Expatriate footballers in Switzerland
People educated at Kings Park Secondary School
Cambridge College alumni
Scottish schoolteachers
Scottish emigrants to the United States